Protein kinase LYK5, also known as LYK5 or STRADα, is a human protein and also denotes the gene encoding it.

Function 
Endogenous LKB1 and STRADα form a complex in which STRADα activates LKB1, resulting in phosphorylation of both partners. Removal of endogenous LYK5 by small interfering RNA abrogates LKB1-induced G1 phase arrest. STRADα stabilizes LKB1 protein both in vivo and in vitro, and is capable of eliciting multiple axons in mouse embryonic cortical cultured neurons when overexpressed with LKB1. STRADα is highly spliced in vivo, and this is both developmentally regulated and tissue-specific, but the unique functions of the splice variants are not yet understood.

Disease linkage
Mutations in the LYK5/STRADα gene are associated with polyhydramnios, megalencephaly and symptomatic epilepsy (collectively known as the PMSE syndrome).

Interactions 
STRADα has been shown to interact with LKB1 and MO25.

References

Further reading